Jingzhou Miao and Dong Autonomous County,  usually referred to as Jingzhou County or abbreviated just as Jingzhou, is an autonomous county of Miao and Dong peoples in Hunan Province, China, the county is under the administration of the prefecture-level city of Huaihua.  It was known as "Jing County", renamed to the present name on February 19, 1987.

Jingzhou is located on the southwestern margin of Hunan Province, adjacent to Guizhou Province. It borders Jinpin, Liping and Tianzhu Counties of Guizhou to the west, Tongdao County to the south, Suining County to the east, Huitong County to the north. The county has six towns and five townships under its jurisdiction, the county seat is the town of Quyang.

Etymology
The name "Jingzhou" appears on official papers dated 1103, when the local leader Yang Shengzhen has allegiance to the Song Empire (960–1279). "Jing" means "pacify" and "zhou" means "prefecture".

History
According to the unearthed cultural relics, human habitation in Jingzhou Miao and Dong Autonomous County dates back the Paleolithic Age.

During the Xia, Shang and Zhou dynasties (2070 BC–256 BC), it belonged to Jingzhou.

During the Spring and Autumn period (722 BC–476 BC), Jingzhou Miao and Dong Autonomous County was under the rule of the state of Chu (1115 BC–223 BC).

The Qin dynasty (221 BC–207 BC) unified China in 221 BC. With the implementation of the system of prefectures and counties, Jingzhou Miao and Dong Autonomous County belonged to Qianzhongjun.

From the Han dynasty (206 BC–220 AD) to Western Jin dynasty (265–317), it came under the jurisdiction of Tancheng County of Wulingjun.

The territory of Jingzhou Miao and Dong Autonomous County has been governed by the Eastern Jin dynasty (317–420), Liu Song dynasty (420–479), Southern Qi dynasty (479–502), Liang dynasty (502–557) and Chen dynasty (557–589).

In 581, Emperor Wen of Sui established the Sui Empire (581–618), it was under the jurisdiction of Longbiao County of Yuanlingjun.

In the Tang dynasty (618–907), it was under the jurisdiction of Langxi County of Xuzhou.

In 911, during the Five Dynasties and Ten Kingdoms period (907–960), Ma Yin commissioned Lü Shizhou to conquer the region, the local leader Yang Zaisi led the army to surrender. But Yang's descendants set up a self-government authority in the region soon.

In 1076, Emperor Shenzong of Song sent soldiers to seize the region and established "Chengzhou" in 1081. In the next year, the imperial court established Quyang County out of Yuanzhou and it used to be in the territory of Chengzhou. In 1103, the local leader Yang Shengzhen has allegiance to the Song Empire (960–1279) and the imperial court renamed the region "Jingzhou". In 1138, Quyang County was renamed Yongping County. The zhou (prefecture) ruled three counties including Yongping, Huitong and Tongdao. From 1167 to 1176, the exploitation and injustice policy sparked off a major rebellion.

The Mongol Yuan Empire (1271–1368) set up province system to maintain control of the vast region. Jingzhou was renamed Jingzhoulu. In 1346, Wu Tianbao and Yang Liuzong, both headers of Miao people, rose up in national rebellion against Mongol occupation. The central government put down the rebellion three years later.

In the Ming dynasty (1368–1644), Jingzhou ruled four counties including Huitong, Tongdao, Suining and Tianzhu.

In the Manchu Qing dynasty (1644–1911), Jingzhou came under the jurisdiction of Hunan-Guangdong Provinces. In 1698, Wu Guangdan, a header of Li people, staged a massive uprising and killed the local military leader Li Chenggong.

The Qing dynasty (1644–1911) collapsed in 1911 and was replaced by the Republic of China. Jingzhou was changed to a county named "Jing County" and belonged to Hunan Province.

In March 1950, the CPC Jing County Committee was founded and Guo Zhiquan served as the Party chief. In October, the People's Government of Jing County was set up. Li Shu was appointed county magistrate and Cao Zhenjia and Ming Yilun were appointed deputy county magistrate. It was under the jurisdiction of Huitong Zhuanqu from January 1950 to August 1952, Zhijiang Zhuanqu from August 1952 to December 1952 and Qianyang Zhuanqu from December 1952 to March 1959. On March 28, 1959, Jing County and Tongdao County merged into one named "Tongdao County". On July 1, 1961, Jing County was split from Tongdao County. In June 1981, Qianyang Zhuanqu was renamed "Huaihua Diqu", Jing County belonged to it. On February 19, 1987, the Jingzhou Miao and Dong Autonomous County was set up with the approval of the State Council.

Administrative division
As of October 2015, Jingzhou Miao and Dong Autonomous County has five townships and six towns under its jurisdiction. The county seat is the town of Quyang.

Geography
Jingzhou Miao and Dong Autonomous County is located in the western Hunan province and southern Huaihua city. The county shares a border with the counties of Jinpin, Liping and Tianzhu to the west, Suining County to the east, Huitong County to the north, and Tongdao Dong Autonomous County to the south. The eastern and western sides of the county are mountainous areas, with basins in the middle and hills in the north.

Climate

Rivers
There are 101 rivers and streams in the county. The Qushui River is the largest river in the county and it has 42 tributaries.

Lakes and reservoirs

There are 50 reservoirs and lakes in Jingzhou Miao and Dong Autonomous County.

Mountains

Demographics
The population of Jingzhou Miao and Dong Autonomous County, according to the 2017 census, is 275,128, of which 70,550 were urban population, 20,4578 were rural population.

According to the 2006 Census, the ethnic makeup of Jingzhou Miao and Dong Autonomous County included: 67,693 Dong people (26%), 122,368 Miao people (47%), 489 Hui people (0.19%), 315 Tujia people (0.12%), and 116 Yao people (0.04%).

Language
Mandarin is the official language. The local people speak Kam language, Hmongic languages, and Dungan language.

Religion
The Dong and Miao people believe in animism and worship ancestors. Buddhism is the earliest foreign religion introduced in the county. Islam spread as Hui people moved into the area.

Education
By the end of 2017, Jingzhou Miao and Dong Autonomous County had one county vocational secondary school, 15 high schools and middle schools, and 15 primary schools.

Transportation

Highway
The G65 Baotou–Maoming Expressway is a north–south highway passing through the county's downtown, commercial, and industrial districts in the eastern part of the county.

The National Highway G209, also popularly known as G209, is a north–south highway passing through commercial and residential districts center of the county limits.

The Provincial Highway S222, more commonly known as "S222", passes through the county leading northeastward to Huitong County and southwestward to Liping County.

The Provincial Highway S221, commonly abbreviated as "S221", runs south-east through Quyang Town and Zhaiya Township.

Rail
The Jiaozuo–Liuzhou railway runs north–south through the county's downtown, commercial, and industrial districts.

Tourism
The famous natural landscapes of Jingzhou Miao and Dong Autonomous County are: Mount Fei, National Forest Park of Mount Paiya, and Mount Jiulong. Major Buddhist temples in the county include Yanshou Temple, Fangguang Temple, Wufeng Temple, Qingyun Temple, and Guixiang Temple. Major Taoist temples in the county include Temple of Wu and Feishan Temple. There are famous academies in the county include Zuoxin Academy, Heshan Academy and Ziyang Academy.

References

Bibliography

External links 
 

 
County-level divisions of Hunan
Huaihua
Miao autonomous counties
Kam autonomous counties